Ayesha Harruna Attah (born December 1983) is a Ghanaian-born fiction writer. She lives in Senegal.

Early years and education
Ayesha Harruna Attah was born in Accra, Ghana, in the 1980s, under a military government, to a mother who was a journalist and father who was a graphic designer. Attah has said: "My parents were my first major influences. They ran a literary magazine called Imagine, which had stories about Accra; articles on art, science, film, books; cartoons—which I especially loved. They were (and still are) my heroes. I discovered Toni Morrison when I was thirteen, and I was hooked. I devoured everything she wrote. I remember reading Paradise, and while its meaning completely evaded me then, I was left feeling like it was the most amazing book written and that one day I wanted to write a world full of strong female characters, just like Ms. Morrison had done."

After growing up in Accra, she moved to Massachusetts and studied biochemistry at Mount Holyoke College, and then she had her Masters degree in magazine journalism at the Columbia University, and she received an MFA in creative writing at New York University.

Writing
She has published five novels. Her debut book Harmattan Rain (2008) was written as the result of a fellowship from Per Ankh Publishers — under the mentorship of Ghanaian novelist Ayi Kwei Armah — and TrustAfrica, and was shortlisted for the 2010 Commonwealth Writers' Prize (Africa Region). Her second novel Saturday's Shadows, published by World Editions in 2015, was nominated for the Kwani? Manuscript Project, and has been published in Dutch (De Geus). Her third novel is The Hundred Wells of Salaga (2019), dealing with "relationships, desires and struggles in women’s lives in Ghana in the late 19th century during the scramble for Africa". She has written The Deep Blue Between, a novel for young adults. And her fifth novel, Zainab Takes New York will be released in April 2022.

As a 2014 AIR Award laureate, Attah was a writer-in-residence at the Instituto Sacatar in Bahia, Brazil. She also won a Miles Morland Foundation Writing Scholarship in 2016 for a proposed non-fiction book on the history of the kola nut.

Harmattan Rain (2008)
Harmattan Rain, published in 2008, follows the story of a three-generation Ghanaian family, including Lizzie-Achiaa, Akua Afriyie and Sugri.

Lizzie-Achiaa was the brave matriarch of their family, who ran off looking for her lover and at the same time pursuing a nursing career. Her rebellious daughter, artist Akua Afriye, strikes out on her own as a single parent in a country rocked by successive coups, and Akua Afriye's only daughter Sugri was a lovely, smart girl who grew up too sheltered then leaves home for university in New York, where she learns that sometimes one can have too much freedom.

Saturday's Shadows (2015)

Set in 1990s West Africa, Saturday's Shadows is about "a family that is struggling to maintain its cohesion in the midst of a tenuous political setting", of which it has been said: "Attah proves once again her proficiency as a writer. She demonstrates her dexterity as a writer with the accuracy and lucidity of her character development."

The Hundred Wells of Salaga (2019)

Aminah lives an idyllic life until she is brutally separated from her home and forced on a journey that transforms her from a daydreamer into a resilient woman. Wurche, the willful daughter of a chief, is desperate to play an important role in her father's court. These two women's lives converge as infighting among Wurche's people threatens the region, during the height of the slave trade at the end of the nineteenth century.

Through the experiences of Aminah and Wurche, The Hundred Wells of Salaga offers a remarkable view of slavery and how the scramble for Africa affected the lives of everyday people.

The Deep Blue Between (2020)

Twin sisters Hassana and Husseina's home is in ruins after a brutal raid. But this is not the end but the beginning of their story, one that will take them to unfamiliar cities and cultures, where they will forge new families, ward off dangers and truly begin to know themselves.
As the twins pursue separate paths in Brazil and the Gold Coast of West Africa, they remain connected through shared dreams of water. But will their fates ever draw them back together?
A sweeping adventure with richly evocative historical settings, The Deep Blue Between is a moving story of the bonds that can endure even the most dramatic change.

Works
Novels
 Harmattan Rain. Popenguine, Senegal, West Africa: Per Ankh, 2008. , 
 Saturday's Shadows. London: World Editions, 2015. , 
 The Hundred Wells of Salaga. New York: Other Press, 2019. , 
 The Deep Blue Between. London: Pushkin Press, 2020. 

Essays
 "Skinny Mini", Ugly Duckling Diaries, July 2015
 "The Intruder", The New York Times Magazine, September 2015
 "Cheikh Anta Diop – An Awakening", Chimurenga, 9 April 2018
 "Opinion: Slow-Cooking History", The New York Times, 10 November 2018
 "Inside Ghana: A Tale of Love, Loss and Slavery", Newsweek, 21 February 2019

Other writing
 "Second Home, Plus Yacht", Yachting Magazine, October 2007
"Incident on the way to the Bakoy Market", Asymptote Magazine, 2013
 "Unborn Children", in Margaret Busby, New Daughters of Africa, 2019.

References

External links

 Author's official website
 "Interview with Ghanaian Writer, Ayesha Harruna Attah", Geosi Reads, 11 March 2013.
 Daniel Musiitwa, "Interview with Ghanaian Author Ayesha Harruna Attah", Africa Book Club, 1 May 2015.
 Ayesha Harruna Attah, "Skinny Mini", Ugly Duckling Diaries, July 2015.
 "Meet the Author: Ayesha Harruna Attah", YouTube: The Wilbur and Niso Smith Foundation, 26 August 2021.
 "New Daughters of Africa Podcast - S01 E04 - Ayesha Harruna Attah". Panashe Chigumadzi is in conversation with Ayesha Harruna Attah, 21 June 2022.

Living people
21st-century Ghanaian women writers
21st-century Ghanaian writers
21st-century novelists
1983 births
Columbia University School of the Arts alumni
Dagomba people
Ghanaian novelists
Ghanaian women novelists
Mount Holyoke College alumni
New York University alumni
New York University Institute of Fine Arts alumni
People from Accra